Joe Duarte (born November 29, 1941) is a former Republican member of the New Hampshire House of Representatives, from Candia. Duarte was born in Viana do Castelo, Portugal. He unsuccessfully ran for the New Hampshire Senate in the 2016 elections. Duarte has nine grandchildren.

For the 2016 United States presidential election, Duarte endorsed Republican nominee Donald Trump.

References

Living people
1941 births
Republican Party members of the New Hampshire House of Representatives
People from Candia, New Hampshire
People from Viana do Castelo
21st-century American politicians
Portuguese emigrants to the United States